Tin Fu may refer to:
 Tin Fu Court, a public housing estate in Tin Shui Wai, Hong Kong
 Tin Fu stop, an MTR Light Rail stop adjacent to the estate
 Tin Fu Tsai, a village in Tuen Mun District